Enrico Aldo Candiani (29 September 1918, in Busto Arsizio – 27 February 2008, in Busto Arsizio) was an Italian professional footballer who played as a midfielder.

Honours
Inter
 Serie A champion: 1939–40.
 Coppa Italia winner: 1938–39.

1918 births
2008 deaths
People from Busto Arsizio
Italian footballers
Serie A players
Serie B players
Serie C players
Inter Milan players
Juventus F.C. players
Aurora Pro Patria 1919 players
A.C. Milan players
U.S. Livorno 1915 players
Calcio Foggia 1920 players
Association football midfielders
Sportspeople from the Province of Varese
Footballers from Lombardy